Khvorcheh (also Romanized as Khūrcheh) is a village in Garakan Rural District, in the Central District of Ashtian County, Markazi Province, Iran. At the 2006 census, its population was 213, in 62 families.

References 

Populated places in Ashtian County